Punhana is a town in Punhana sub-division in the Nuh district in the Indian state of Haryana.

Geography
Punahana is the largest town of Mewat, at an average elevation of 187 metres (613 feet).

Demographics
 census, Punahana had a population of 13,178. Males constitute 52% of the population and females 48%. Punahana has an average literacy rate of 53%, lower than the national average of 59.5%: male literacy is 63% and female literacy is 41%. In Punahana, 21% of the population is under 6 years of age. The district has a low population when compared to the population density of India.

Nearby towns
 Pinangwan
 Ferozepur Jhirka
 Hodal
 Nuh
 Hathin

References

Cities and towns in Nuh district
Mewat